Petra Pajalič (born 1 June 1988) is a retired professional Slovenian tennis player, who specialises in doubles.

Pajalič has career-high WTA rankings of 532 in singles, achieved on 8 September 2008, and 393 in doubles, set on 21 April 2008. She has won 1 doubles titles on the ITF Women's Circuit.

Pajalič made her main-draw debut on the WTA Tour in doubles competition at the 2007 Banka Koper Slovenia Open, partnering Taja Mohorčič The pair lost their first round match against Sybille Bammer and Polona Hercog.

Personal life 
She speaks English and Slovenian. She received a law degree from Bežigrad Grammar School. Pajalič retired from professional in 2010. Petra Pajalič Studio Moderna, an e-commerce and direct-to-consumer advertising company operating mainly in Central and Eastern Europe, works in the field of marketing.

ITF finals

Doubles (1 titles, 4 runner–ups)

ITF junior finals

Doubles (1–2)

References

External links 
 
 

1988 births
Living people
Sportspeople from Ljubljana
Slovenian female tennis players